Wom or WOM may refer to:

Businesses and organizations
WOM SA Telephone operator in South America
World of Motion, a former EPCOT Center attraction
AT&T High Seas Service, callsign WOM
W. O. Mitchell Elementary School, the abbreviation of a school in Ottawa
WOM magazin, a German music magazine

Places
Wom Brook, a brook in South Staffordshire, England
WOM, station code for Wombwell railway station
Cape Wom, Papua New Guinea

Other
Wom language (disambiguation)
Write-only memory (disambiguation), a term in computing
Wake-on-Modem, turn on device from sleeping
Barry Wom, member of fictitious band The Rutles
WOM marketing